Nicole Remis (born 28 January 1980) is an Austrian former professional tennis player.

Born in Stockerau, Remis reached a best ranking on tour of 283 in the world. She won an ITF tournament in Lecce in 1997 and featured in the main draw of the 2001 Austrian Open.

ITF finals

Singles: 3 (1–2)

Doubles: 6 (3–3)

References

External links
 
 

1980 births
Living people
Austrian female tennis players
People from Stockerau
Sportspeople from Lower Austria